The Gurkha's Daughter is a collection of short stories by Indian author Prajwal Parajuly, describing and dramatizing the experiences of Nepali-speaking people and the Nepali diaspora. The Hindustan Times described it as the "best short story collection you have read in a while".

The Stories
The book comprises eight stories based upon the Nepali-speaking societies of and around Nepal. Most of the stories in the book happen in Gorkhaland, that lies in the frontier of Nepal and India.

Critical response 
In The Asian Review of Books, Nigel Collett called The Gurkha's Daughter a "promising debut", adding that Parajuly, "gets deep under the skin of his characters to reveal the often very difficult circumstances in which they live. I am aware of no other writer in English who has so vividly brought to life the dilemmas and constrictions of daily Nepalese life. The effect is poignant."  Babatdor Dkhar of the Calcutta Telegraph referenced the initial buzz surrounding Parajuly's two-book deal, saying that fears he would not live up to expectation proved unfounded.  "Parajuly paints colourful landscapes of a world that forever has remained in the background. A world that made sense in the stereotype. A world whose characters come out of their small roles and make the starring ones their own. He brings to life the dreams, the everyday, the aspirations, the failures, love, the differences that add and the ones that remove."  The Lady magazine gave three stars to the collection, saying they were, "Stylistically reminiscent of Raymond Carver, while at the same time opening a door on to an unfamiliar world." John Garth in The Guardian has written a long review of the book.

Honors 
On 7 October 2013, The Gurkha's Daughter was among seven titles short-listed for the Dylan Thomas Prize.

Translation 
The book was translated in Nepali as Gurkha ki Chhori and was published in 2015.

References 

2012 short story collections
Indian literature
Indian short story collections
Quercus (publisher) books